Mazegh or Mazagh, also rendered as Mazigh or Maziq, may refer to:
 Mazegh, Rudan, Rudan County, Hormozgan Province, Iran
 Mazagh-e Kurian, Minab County, Hormozgan Province, Iran
 Mazegh-e Bala, Minab County, Hormozgan Province, Iran
 Mazegh-e Pain, Minab County, Hormozgan Province, Iran